Lescott Kevin Lyttle Coombs (born 14 September 1976), is a Vincentian soca artist, who had a worldwide hit with "Turn Me On" in 2003, recorded with the dancehall artist Spragga Benz.

Career
Lyttle was encouraged by his family to pursue music at the young age and has been performing at local events in his teens. Prior to his musical career, Lyttle had subsisted on day jobs, such as customs officer and radio disc jockey. Investing his savings of EC$1,500, Lyttle recorded "Turn Me On" as a soca ballad in Saint Vincent and the Grenadines in 2001, and the song subsequently became a radio hit throughout the Caribbean.

Lyttle signed with Atlantic Records in 2003 and a remixed version of "Turn Me On" was officially released as a single in the UK at the end of the year, with dancehall pop artist Spragga Benz's guest vocals. The song reached number two in the UK, spending seven weeks in the Top 10 of the UK Singles Chart. It eventually became a worldwide hit in 2004, reaching number 4 in the United States, number 3 in Australia and placing within Top 5 in many European countries.

The debut self-titled album Kevin Lyttle followed in July 2004, charting within Top 10 in the US, where it was certified Gold, and meeting with a minor success in Europe. The second single, "Last Drop", was released in markets outside the US, but didn't manage to repeat the success of "Turn Me On", becoming only a minor hit in Europe. "Drive Me Crazy" was released as the third single in autumn 2004, followed by a promotional only single "I Got It". Both songs were commercial failures. In 2005, Lyttle released a new song in Jamaica only, "Jimmy Johnny".

In 2007, along with Byron Lee and Arrow, he performed at the Cricket World Cup opening ceremony in Greenfield Stadium, Jamaica. The same year Kevin Lyttle founded his own record label, Tarakon Records. Lyttle's second album, Fyah, was released by Tarakon and Universal Records in 2008, featuring a duet version of "Turn Me On" recorded with Alison Hinds and contributions from other artists. The title song was released as the first single and both the single and the album were unsuccessful in terms of commercial performance.

Lyttle released "Anywhere", a collaboration single with Flo Rida in 2011, followed by "Nobody Like U", accompanied by a remix contest. The music video featured model Tania Marie Caringi. His third studio album, I Love Carnival, was released in 2012, promoted by "Wine and Go Down" and the title song. 2013 saw the release of his new single, "Bounce", followed by "Feel So Good", a collaboration with Shaggy, in 2014.

In 2016, American electronic group Cheat Codes sampled Lyttle's "Turn Me On" in a remix entitled "Let Me Hold You (Turn Me On)". The following year, American singer Chris Brown also sampled "Turn Me On" to make his song Questions in 2017.

Personal life
Born Lescott Kevin Lyttle Coombs in Kingstown, Saint Vincent and the Grenadines, Lyttle now lives in Miami, Florida. He is married to Dr. Jacqueline James, with whom he has a son.

Discography

Studio albums

Extended plays

Singles

References

External links
 

1976 births
Atlantic Records artists
Living people
People from Kingstown
Saint Vincent and the Grenadines emigrants to the United States
Saint Vincent and the Grenadines musicians
Soca musicians
People from Miami